Yan Han may refer to:

 Yan Han (artist) (1916–2011), Chinese artist and teacher
 Yan Han (figure skater) (born 1996), Chinese figure skater